Westfield is a historic train station located at Westfield in Chautauqua County, New York. It was constructed in 1904, for the Lake Shore and Michigan Southern Railway (absorbed in 1914 by the New York Central Railroad).  It is a -story brick, terra cotta, and sandstone structure in the Romanesque style.  It served as the main transfer point for rail passengers destined for the Chautauqua Institution. The Jamestown, Westfield and Northwestern Railroad interurban, serving the eastern part of Chautauqua used the station. The Chautauqua Traction Company, serving the Chautauqua hamlet, used the Nickel Plate Railroad's station in Westfield.

It is co-located with the Lake Shore & Michigan Southern Freight Depot.

It was listed on the National Register of Historic Places in 1983 as the Lake Shore and Michigan Southern Railway Station.

References

External links
Lake Shore & Michigan Southern Railroad Station - Westfield, NY - U.S. National Register of Historic Places on Waymarking.com

Railway stations in the United States opened in 1904
Railway stations on the National Register of Historic Places in New York (state)
Former New York Central Railroad stations
Transportation buildings and structures in Chautauqua County, New York
National Register of Historic Places in Chautauqua County, New York
Former railway stations in New York (state)